Nationality words link to articles with information on the nation's poetry or literature (for instance, Irish or France).

Events

Works published

814:
 Text of the Wessobrunn Prayer in Old High German

Births
Death years link to the corresponding "[year] in poetry" article. There are conflicting or unreliable sources for the birth years of many people born in this period; where sources conflict, the poet is listed again and the conflict is noted:

813:
 Li Shangyin (died 858), Chinese poet of the late Tang Dynasty

815:
 Johannes Scotus Eriugena (died 877), among the last Hiberno-Latin poets

816:
 Henjo (died 890), one of the Six best Waka poets and Thirty-six Poetry Immortals
 Sosei (died 910), one of the Thirty-six Poetry Immortals

818:
 Ariwara no Yukihira (died 893), Japanese Heian period courtier, poet and bureaucrat

Deaths
Birth years link to the corresponding "[year] in poetry" article:

810:
 Abu Nuwas (born 756), classical Arabic and Persian poeta

814:
 February 18 - Angilbert (born c. 760), Frankish ecclesiastic and poet, canonized

816:
 Li He (born 790), Chinese poet of the late Tang dynasty

819:
 Liu Zongyuan (born 773), Chinese writer, poet and politician

See also

 Poetry
 9th century in poetry
 9th century in literature
 List of years in poetry

Other events:
 Other events of the 12th century
 Other events of the 13th century

9th century:
 9th century in poetry
 9th century in literature

Notes

References 

Poetry by year
Poetry